Loveblood is the third extended play by the British indie rock band Sundara Karma. The EP was released on 4 November 2016.

The EP contained the four lead singles ahead of their debut studio album, Youth Is Only Ever Fun in Retrospect: "Loveblood", "Olympia", "She Said", and "A Young Understanding". Additionally, the extended play consisted of the song, "The Night".

Track listing

References

External links 
 

2016 EPs
Sundara Karma EPs
Sony Music EPs